"Circle" was the third single from Boulder, Colorado-based rock band Big Head Todd and the Monsters' major label debut album Sister Sweetly, which eventually went platinum.  It reached #21 on the Mainstream Rock Chart, with their first two singles, "Bittersweet" and "Broken Hearted Savior", also charting.

Big Head Todd & the Monsters performed "Circle" during an appearance on the Late Show with David Letterman.  A music video was also made, which features the band playing the song live interspersed with clips of a dog chained to a post, running in circles while his master holds up sheets of OSB with various shapes painted on them.

1993 singles
Big Head Todd and the Monsters songs
1993 songs
Giant Records (Warner) singles